Parliamentary elections were held in Bulgaria on 7 June 1981. The Fatherland Front, dominated by the Bulgarian Communist Party, was the only organisation to contest the election; all candidate lists had to be approved by the Front. The Front nominated one candidate for each constituency. Of the 400 candidates 271 were members of the Communist Party, 99 were members of the Bulgarian Agrarian National Union and the remaining 30 were unaffiliated. Voter turnout was reportedly 99.9%.

Results

References

Bulgaria
1981 in Bulgaria
Parliamentary elections in Bulgaria
One-party elections
Single-candidate elections
1981 elections in Bulgaria
June 1981 events in Europe